Mountain Rhythm is a 1939 American Western film directed by B. Reeves Eason and starring Gene Autry, Smiley Burnette, and June Storey. Based on a story by Connie Lee, the film is about a cowboy who organizes his fellow ranchers to oppose an Eastern promoter's land grab scheme.

Plot
Aunt Mathilde "Ma" Hutchins (Maude Eburne) and the other ranchers of the valley are in danger of losing her ranches. Mr. Cavanaugh (Walter Fenner), an Eastern promoter, wants to develop a dude ranch on their land. In order to get their land, Cavanaugh arranges for the government to put up nearby public lands for auction—lands the ranchers use to graze their cattle. The auction would drive the ranchers out of business and allow Cavanaugh to acquire the land at a cheap price.

Gene Autry (Gene Autry) and Ma's nephew Frog Millhouse (Smiley Burnette) come to the rescue. Gene organizes the ranchers to pool their funds and sell their herds in order to raise enough money to bid on the land at auction. As Gene and Frog return with the proceeds of the cattle sale, they are ambushed by Cavanaugh's men, who steal the money. With the help of the hoboes in the valley, who are led by Judge Homer Worthington (Ferris Taylor) and Rocky (Jack Pennick), Gene stages another roundup using the hoboes as ranch hands. They round up enough cattle to buy the land at auction and save their valley.

Cast
 Gene Autry as Gene Autry
 Smiley Burnette as Frog Millhouse
 Maude Eburne as Aunt Mathilde "Ma" Hutchins
 Ferris Taylor as Judge Homer Worthington
 Walter Fenner as Mr. Cavanaugh
 Jack Pennick as Rocky
 Hooper Atchley as Mr. Daniels
 Bernard Suss as MacCauley
 Ed Cassidy as Sheriff Dalrimple
 Jack Ingram as Henchman Ed Carney
 Tom London as Deputy Tom
 Roger Williams as Rancher Kimball
 Frankie Marvin as Cowhand Burt
 Slim Whitaker as Deputy Slim (uncredited)
 Champion as Gene's Horse (uncredited)

Production

Stuntwork
 Ken Cooper (Gene's double)
 Jack Kirk (Smiley's double)
 Nellie Walker
 Joe Yrigoyen

Filming locations
 Iverson Ranch, 1 Iverson Lane, Chatsworth, Los Angeles, California, USA
 Walker Ranch
 Andy Jauregui Ranch, Placerita Canyon Road, Newhall, California, USA
 Barney Oldfield's Resort

Soundtrack
 "Highways Are Happy Ways (When They Lead the Way to Home)" (Larry Shay, Harry Harris, Tommie Malie) by Gene Autry, Smiley Burnette, Ferris Taylor, and Jack Pennick
 "It Makes No Difference Now" (Jimmie Davis, Floyd Tillman) by Gene Autry and Smiley Burnette in jail
 "It Was Only a Hobo's Dream" (Gene Autry, Johnny Marvin, Fred Rose) by Gene Autry (vocal) and Smiley Burnette (vocal and concertina)
 "Old MacDonald Had a Farm" (Traditional) by Gene Autry, Smiley Burnette, June Storey, and hotel guests on the hayride
 "The Old Grey Mare" (Traditional) by Gene Autry and hotel guests on the hayride
 "Long, Long Ago" (Thomas Haynes Bayley) by Gene Autry and hotel guests on the hayride
 "Oh, Dem Golden Slippers!" (James Allen Bland) by Gene Autry, Smiley Burnette, and hotel guests on the hayride
 "Put on Your Old Grey Bonnet" (Percy Wenrich, Stanley Murphy) by Gene Autry, Smiley Burnette, June Storey, and hotel guests on the hayride
 "Put on Your Old Grey Bonnet" (Reprise) by Gene Autry, Smiley Burnette, June Storey, Maude Eburne, Ferris Taylor, and Jack Pennick at the end
 "Gold Mine in Your Heart" (Gene Autry, Johnny Marvin, Fred Rose) by Gene Autry (vocal and guitar)
 "Knights of the Open Road" (Gene Autry, Johnny Marvin, Fred Rose) by the Hoboes, with Smiley Burnette on the concertina

References
Citations

Bibliography

External links
 
 
 
 

1939 films
American Western (genre) films
1939 Western (genre) films
American black-and-white films
Republic Pictures films
Films directed by B. Reeves Eason
1930s English-language films
1930s American films